Valery Strypeykis (born 13 November 1974) is a retired Belarusian professional footballer. His latest club was Miory in 2012. Between 2013 and 2016 he managed Naftan Novopolotsk.

Honours

Club
Slavia Mozyr
 Belarusian Premier League champion: 2000
 Belarusian Cup winner: 1999–2000

FBK Kaunas
 A Lyga champion: 2003

Naftan Novopolotsk
 Belarusian Cup winner: 2008–09, 2011–12

Individual 
 Belarusian Premier League top scorer (4): 1999, 2002, 2004, 2005
 CIS Cup top goalscorer: 2001 (shared)

References

External links
 
 
 Valeriy Stripeikis at Footballdatabase

1974 births
Living people
Belarusian footballers
Association football forwards
Belarusian people of Lithuanian descent
Belarus international footballers
Belarusian expatriate footballers
Expatriate footballers in Slovakia
Expatriate footballers in Lithuania
FC Naftan Novopolotsk players
FC Slavia Mozyr players
MFK Ružomberok players
FC Belshina Bobruisk players
FC BATE Borisov players
FBK Kaunas footballers
FC Gomel players
FC Shakhtyor Soligorsk players
Belarusian football managers
FC Naftan Novopolotsk managers
Sportspeople from Pinsk